Ultimate School Musical is a Fox8 reality television programme in Australia which features ordinary teenagers from a school attempting to put on a music production to a professional standard in just six weeks.

Australia
Ultimate School Musical, Australia, has been hosted by model and VJ Ruby Rose and directed by actor, comedian and musician Eddie Perfect.

References

External links
fox8.tv Ultimate School Musical

Television series by Fremantle (company)
2010s Australian reality television series
Fox8 original programming
2010 Australian television series debuts
Musical television series